Herman B. Wegner (January 3, 1891 - February 26, 1964) was a member of the Wisconsin State Assembly.

Biography
Wegner was born on January 3, 1891, in Milwaukee, Wisconsin. He made his living as a shoe and leather cutter and as a coal salesman.

Political career
Wegner was a member of the Assembly from 1933 to 1944. Originally a member of the Socialist Party of America, he later became affiliated with the Wisconsin Progressive Party.

References

Politicians from Milwaukee
Members of the Wisconsin State Assembly
Wisconsin Progressives (1924)
20th-century American politicians
Socialist Party of America politicians from Wisconsin
1891 births
1964 deaths